Elio Rinero (born April 8, 1947 in Beinasco) is a retired Italian professional football player.

Honours
 Serie A champion: 1966/67.

1947 births
Living people
Italian footballers
Serie A players
Juventus F.C. players
Hellas Verona F.C. players
S.S. Lazio players
Genoa C.F.C. players
Reggina 1914 players
S.P.A.L. players
U.S. Salernitana 1919 players
S.S.C. Bari players
Association football midfielders